Blackheart is a Marvel Comics character.

Blackheart may also refer to:

 Blackheart (album), a 2015 album by Dawn Richard
 Blackheart (plant disease),  a non-parasitic fruit disease that causes rotting from the inside.
 Blackheart Beagle, a Disney character from the Donald Duck franchise; see List of Donald Duck universe characters
 Blackheart Records, an American record label founded by rock musicians Joan Jett and Kenny Laguna

See also
 Black Heart (disambiguation)